Carceliodoria is a genus of flies in the family Tachinidae.

Species
Carceliodoria palpalis Townsend, 1928

Distribution
Peru.

References

Exoristinae
Tachinidae genera
Diptera of South America
Monotypic Brachycera genera
Taxa named by Charles Henry Tyler Townsend